In Scottish folklore, the Beast of Buchan is a big cat or phantom cat reportedly sighted mainly in the historic Buchan area of Aberdeenshire in northeastern Scotland. Sightings throughout other areas of Scotland, stretching from the northern highlands down to the border with England, have also been claimed; the earliest claims date back to the 1930s.

Background
Sightings of the Buchan beast have been recorded since the 1930s; preliminary reports of big cats throughout Britain, however date to much earlier times. Writing in his book Rural Rides, the author William Cobbett described seeing a cat similar in size to a medium-sized spaniel when he was a child in Surrey during the 1760s; he identified it as being the same type of animal as a lynx he saw years later in America. The keeping of exotic pets on large British country estates was not unheard of by the middle of the 18th century and circuses began travelling with menageries. In 1868 five leopards escaped from their cages while being transported between Lockerbie and Moffat but were all re-captured.

The UK has two native species of cat that live in the wild, domestic feral cats and wildcats. Throughout the UK reports of large cats became widespread; in 2006 a survey indicated there were 6,000 sightings of exotic cats in the preceding five years while an article in The Guardian speculated there could be up to 7,000 sightings annually. Author and environmentalist George Monbiot, however quotes a lower figure giving an estimated number of 2,000 sightings a year. The use of alliteration particularly appeals to the media and it was in the 1980s the animals began to be generally referred to as the "Beasts of ...". During the first six years of the 21st century fifty sightings were reported including areas stretching from Ardersier in the north through to Inverurie and Fraserburgh occasionally as far south as the English border, although the highest concentration is in rural areas of Aberdeenshire. In the period from May 2000 until January 2002, twenty-two sightings were reported to Grampian Police but the force believed it likely 80 percent of sightings were never reported.

Alex Salmond raised concerns about attacks on farm livestock by the Beast in the House of Commons in 1997; at the time he was the Member of parliament for the Banff and Buchan constituency. The matter was raised again in 2002 when Ross Finnie, at that time Minister for the Environment and Rural Development, was asked by Richard Lochhead, the Scottish National Party member of parliament for northeast Scotland, to instigate a formal enquiry concerning the reports.

Claims of sightings

A Cruden Bay farmer found the carcass of one of his sheep spread across a field in 2006; he was sure it was not savaged by a dog and stated that workers had recently seen a "huge, slinky cat skulking around". Two years later, in October 2008, a cat resembling a leopard was allegedly seen by a woman in the same area. A large catlike creature was blamed for the slaughter of sheep during 1998 around Inverness.

The Formartine and Buchan Way follows the  route of the former railway lines in Buchan; converted into a pathway and cycle lane at the beginning of the 1990s, it is attractive to wildlife and the animal frequents it. The creature was seen by a resident of Old Deer on two occasions on it in August 2011 just a few days apart. He described the animal as being timid yet not scared, larger than his own average-sized Labrador, solid black in colour with a bushy head and tail. According to a Scotland on Sunday newspaper reporter writing in 2006, the size of the beast varies from being like an Alsatian or Greyhound.

Reports of humans being attacked by the Beast are rare; in 2002, however, a woman was leaving a stable near Insch when the creature bit and clawed her leg before being chased away. She sustained bruising and puncture marks to her upper thigh. Her friend who witnessed the attack described a cat-like Labrador sized "sleek black beastie".

Likely explanations
In Scotland the hounds are known as Cù Sìth, although the colour is generally a dark shade of green The feline folklore equivalent, the Cat Sìth, may have been inspired by sightings of Kellas cats – a felid hybrid of domestic cats and wildcats – specimens of which have been discovered in  Buchan. The Zoology Museum at the University of Aberdeen holds a mounted specimen of a Kellas. In April 2002, the headless carcass of a larger than average feline was found at a Boddam roadside. A Kellas cat was unlikely to be big enough to kill fully grown sheep and  the farmer considered it doubtful that the animal whose carcass he discovered would be able to do so either. The woman attacked near Insch in 2002 was familiar with Kellas cats and was adamant the animal that attacked her was not a Kellas.

Sightings of the creatures from just after the Second World War may have occurred after pumas owned by USAAF personnel were set free if the pilots did not return; they had kept the animals as mascots when based in Scotland.

The Dangerous Wild Animals Act passed into law in 1976, and some reports may be sightings of pumas or jaguars released from captivity after owners felt unable to meet the licensing conditions introduced by the new legislation. Attacks on poultry labelled as being caused by the beast in 2009 were attributed to foxes but later a "particularly ferocious wildcat" was caught after an incident when a pet German Shepherd was attacked. The wildcat was examined by a local wildlife veterinary surgeon who later set it free at an unknown location.

Writing in The Folklore Society journal Folklore in 1992 the folklorist Michael Goss suggests that while some sightings may be authentic, the majority are a type of contemporary legend.

References

Notes

Citations

Bibliography

Individual animals in Scotland
Buchan
Scottish legendary creatures
Cat folklore
Mythological felines